Árni Sigurðsson (born 22 May 1965) is an Icelandic breaststroke swimmer. He competed in two events at the 1984 Summer Olympics.

References

External links
 

1965 births
Living people
Arni Sigurdsson
Arni Sigurdsson
Swimmers at the 1984 Summer Olympics
Place of birth missing (living people)